Harry Eubank King (1902 - 1981) was a lawyer and state legislator in Florida. He served in the Florida Senate from 1941 to 1956. He was a Democrat. The Florida Archives have photographs of him. He represented Polk County, the 7th District.

He served as City Attorney for Winter Haven.

References

External links
Findagrave entry

This draft is in progress as of October 18, 2022.

1902 births
1981 deaths
20th-century American lawyers
20th-century American politicians
Democratic Party Florida state senators
City and town attorneys in the United States
People from Winter Haven, Florida
Florida lawyers